The Cabinet of Ivica Dačić was elected on 27 July 2012 by a majority vote in the National Assembly. The coalition government was composed of the Let's Get Serbia Moving alliance, the SPS-PUPS-JS, and United Regions of Serbia.  The Cabinet was reshuffled on 2 September 2013.

Cabinet members

See also
Cabinet of Mirko Cvetković
Cabinet of Aleksandar Vučić (disambiguation)
Cabinet of Serbia

References

External links

Serbia
2012 establishments in Serbia
2014 disestablishments in Serbia
Cabinets established in 2012
Cabinets disestablished in 2014